Romsey Town Football Club is a football club based in Romsey, Hampshire, England. The club is affiliated to the Hampshire Football Association and is an FA chartered Standard club Formed in 1886, Romsey have always been around the 9th and 10th tiers of English Football but have once in their history reached the Fourth Qualifying Round of the FA Cup in the 1990–91 season. They were among the founding members of the Wessex League in 1986. The club plays at the AEC Protection Ground (previously known as the Bypass Ground) which they moved to in 1956.

History
The club was formed in 1886 when a meeting took place at the Town Hall "to consider the desirability of forming a football club in the town." Initially, they played at Alma Road and in 1889 began playing in local league football where they had successful spells in a number of competitions before joining the Southampton League as founder members in 1908.

The 1920s were a good decade for Romsey Town and after winning the Hampshire Intermediate Cup and the Southampton Senior League they gained entry into the Hampshire League but struggled in the West Division and returned to local football after just one season. In 1930, Romsey moved to Priestlands, which is now Romsey School, and returned to the Hampshire League where they were placed in Division 2. Here the club were better prepared as they went on to produce some of their best attacking sides, featuring well in both league and cup competitions.

In 1956, they were relegated and moved to their current home, The Bypass Ground. Romsey continued in Division 3 but the early 1960s saw a further decline in fortune, eventually resulting in relegation from the league in 1964. Because the football pyramid was not yet in existence, the club were forced to drop right down to replace their reserves in Junior Division 1 of the Southampton League and it was not until 1968 that they won promotion back to the senior section.

By the 1970s, the club started to re-surface out of the doldrums of lower league football and after three successive promotions and a Southampton Senior Cup triumph in 1974. Romsey regained their Hampshire League status in 1975 where they promptly won the Division 4 title at the first attempt. Romsey proceeded to end the decade on a high note, again winning promotion and the Hampshire Intermediate Cup in 1978 followed by arguably their finest hour a year later when they won Division 2 title and unexpectedly defeated Farnborough Town 1–0 in the Hampshire Senior Cup final played at The Dell.

The 1980s saw Romsey consolidate in Division 1 before becoming founder members of the Wessex League in 1986. Here they soon became a strong force, and after some encouraging campaigns, they clinched the title in 1990 and enjoyed numerous good cup runs, most notably in 1990 when they lost 1–2 at home to Littlehampton Town in the 4th Qualifying Round of the FA Cup.

A change of personnel saw Romsey fall into decline, and after a nightmare season in 1993 they were relegated back to Division 1 of the Hampshire League, from where they were again relegated. This was despite the club running an extremely successful Youth System with Phil Glass Under 18s winning the Wessex Youth League and reaching Quarter final of FA Youth Cup where they were narrowly beaten by Yeovil Towns Full-time Apprentices, The team captained by Paul Mabey were expected to boost the club for years to come but reluctance by senior management to pick youth meant players were lost for several years, Despite these setbacks, Romsey bounced back and within two years with high profile local players returning such as Mabey, Paul Glass, Glenn Burnett, Peter Kelly, Stuart Carpenter & James Kirby the good times returned to the Bypass Ground and they won the Southampton Senior Cup and promotion back to the Wessex League. However, they struggled in what had become a much harder competition. In 1998, Romsey were again relegated back to the Hampshire League and a series of managers and large turn-over of players saw them slip into the league's third division. In 2003, the club hit an all-time low when they bottom but the club were re-elected, and since then they have enjoyed a remarkable upturn in fortunes.

In 2004 the Wessex League absorbed the original Hampshire League and due to their facilities Romsey were placed in Division 1 and after some encouraging final placings they won promotion in 2007 back to the top flight, now known as the Premier Division. In the 2007–08 season with manager Glenn Burnett at the helm Romsey's team spirit was at an all-time high. The team were performing well on the pitch as well with two consecutive mid-table finishes really consolidating Romsey's position in the Wessex Premier League. At the end of the 2009–10 season, Glenn Burnett decided to step down blaming his decision to leave on how much he had to do at the club. Assistant manager Lee Harrison soon followed suit, as well as a large percentage of the squad that Glenn had been crafting over the last few seasons. In the 2010–11 season, backed by the new management duo of Wayne Mew and Stuart Long, began with many trials as Romsey searched to rebuild a team. In the end, Romsey finished in 16th position in the league despite a lack of players. One of the high points of the season was Romsey's longest-serving and most prolific player in their history, Simon De'ath, who finished with 25 league goals, placing him seventh in the goalscorer charts.

Wayne Mew continued at the helm for the 2011–12 and managed to keep hold of striker Simon De'ath despite interest from numerous other clubs.

Following one of Romsey's most successful seasons, where Simon De'ath was once again top scorer, after finishing in 8th place alongside two cup quarter finals, manager Wayne Mew decided to resign from the Bypass Ground. Francis Benali also resigned from the post as reserve team boss.

On Thursday 31 May, Romsey appointed Danny Barker as manager taking over from former boss Wayne Mew. In his first full season in charge of the club, the side finished second bottom in the league but were spared relegation after Hayling United were relegated due to ground grading issues.

On 22 October 2013, manager Danny Barker resigned from his post with the club sitting in 22nd place in the league. Carl Bennett and later John McFarlane took over as co-managers but on 30 April 2014, James Phillips was appointed the new head coach, after the club finished bottom of the league.

The club then appointed Andy Samuels as Manager and whilst they finished second bottom in 2014/15, there has been steady improvement, with mid table finishes in 2015/16 and 2016/17, leading to a promotion challenges in 2017/18 and 2018/ 19 which resulted in a sixth and fourth place finishes.  During the summer Andy Samuels stepped down and has been replaced by Chris McGinn, a former professional footballer and international coach.

League History

Source:

Ground

Romsey Town play their home games at The AEC Protection Ground, South Front, Romsey, SO51 8GJ.

Romsey Town first played on fields which have since been built on at Alma Road but now play their home matches at the AEC Protection Ground (previously known as the Bypass Ground) and have done so since 1956 after they were successful in their application for a 99-year lease on the area of the land the ground is built on from nearby Broadlands.

The ground now has a stand on the far side of the pitch, a smaller stand on the near side as well as a fence which covers a large section of the near side. The ground also has recently re-built changing rooms, hospitality room, refreshments bar and a club house which includes a bar.

Fans and progress
A loyal core of fans continue to support 'The Town' but Romsey Town's new management, as of early 2020, has invested a lot of time and money making the ground something that Romsey Town itself can be proud of. Many new local town sponsors are onboard to allow this to happen, with local food and bar supplies as well as local building and trades to help with maintaining the club and grounds. Importantly the club is making its mission to be a community club offering its facilities to other local sports and social clubs needing a location for their events. Support for local football seems to be growing and it was felt that investment into the facilities was needed to support this.

Honours
Wessex League
Champions 1989–90
Hampshire League Division 2
Champions 1978–79
Runners-up 1994–95
Hampshire League Division 3
Runners-up 1946–47, 1977–78 & 2003–04
Hampshire League Division 4
Champions 1975–76
Hampshire Senior Cup
Winners 1978–79
Runners-up 1948–49
Hampshire Intermediate Cup
Winners 1926–26, 1930–31 & 1977–78
Hampshire Junior Cup
Winners 1900–01, 1909–10 & 1923–24
Runners-up 1898–99 & 1899–1900
Russell Cotes Cup
Runners-up 1932–33 & 1988–89
Southampton Senior Cup
Winners 1973–74 & 1994–95
Runners-up 1927–28, 1928–29, 1929–30 & 2007–08
Southampton Junior Cup
Winners 1922–23
Southampton League Premier Division
Champions 1980–81 & 1983–84
Southampton League Senior Division 1
Champions 1926–27, 1973–74 & 1976–77
Runners-up 1910–11
Southampton League Senior Division 2
Champions 1972–73
Runners-up 1968–69
Southampton League West Division
Champions 1951–52
Southampton League Romsey Division
Champions 1927–28
Southampton League Junior Division 3
Runners-up 1924–25
Southampton League Junior Division 4
Champions 1974–75
Salisbury & District League
Champions 1898–99
South Hants League
Champions 1900–01
Winchester League
Champions 1921–22
Eastleigh League
Champions 1922–23, 1923–24, 1928–29
Runners-up 1921–22, 1927–28 & 1929–30
Romsey Hospital Cup
Winners 1933–34

Records
Romsey's record performance in the FA Cup is the Fourth Qualifying Round which they reached in 1990–91 season. Since 2009, Romsey have entered the FA Cup at the earliest round of the cup — the Extra Preliminary Round. Romsey's record in the FA Vase is the Third Round, achieved in 1988–89.

FA Cup
Fourth Qualifying Round 1990–91
FA Vase
Third Round 1988–89

F.A. Cup record
Romsey have entered the FA Cup 17 times:

See also
Romsey Town players
Romsey Town managers

References

External links

Football clubs in Hampshire
Wessex Football League
Association football clubs established in 1886
Football clubs in England
Romsey
1886 establishments in England
Winchester and District Saturday Football League